The Aucher Baronetcy of Bishopsbourne in the County of Kent, was a title in the Baronetage of England. It was created on 4 July 1666 for Anthony Aucher, who had previously represented Canterbury in Parliament. The title became extinct on the death of the third Baronet in 1726.

Aucher baronets, of Bishopsbourne (1666)
Sir Anthony Aucher, 1st Baronet (1614–1692)
Sir Anthony Aucher, 2nd Baronet (–1695)
Sir Hewitt Aucher, 3rd Baronet (c. 1687–1726)

References

Extinct baronetcies in the Baronetage of England
1666 establishments in England